Hélio Waldman is a Brazilian scientist best known for his work as rector of the Universidade Federal do ABC, UFABC (2010–2014) and as dean of research at the Universidade Estadual de Campinas, Unicamp (1986–1990). Currently working as a researcher and rector of UFABC.

Career

Waldman has served as:
 Rector of the Universidade Federal do ABC (UFABC).
 Dean of Research at the Universidade Estadual de Campinas (Unicamp).
 Editor of the Journal of the Brazilian Society of Telecommunications (SBrT).
 President of the Brazilian Society of Telecommunications (SBrT).
 Director of Faculdade de Engennharia de Campinas.
 Professor, Institute Alberto Luiz Coimbra of Graduate Studies and Research in Engineering (COPPE/UFRJ).

Education
 Electronic Engineering - Instituto Tecnológico de Aeronáutica, ITA - 1966.
 M.Sc. (Electrical Engineering) - Stanford University - 1968.
 Ph.D. (Electrical Engineering) - Stanford University - 1972.

Published Books
 Telecomunicações: Princípios e Tendências (in English: Telecommunications: Principles and Trends). 1997, Editor Erica, São Paulo.
 Fibras Opticas: Tecnologia e Projeto de Sistemas (in English: Optical Fibers: Technology and Systems Design). 1991, Makron Books, New York.
 Processamento de Sinais Digitais (in English: Digital Signal Processing). 1987, La Kapelusz Editorial, Buenos Aires.

Awards

 Commander of the Ordem Nacional do Mérito Científico - President of the Republic of Brazil - 2010.
 Productivity Research Fellow of the Conselho Nacional de Desenvolvimento Científico e Tecnológico, CNPq - Level 1B.
 Emeritus Member of SBrT - Brazilian Society of Telecommunications, SBrT - 2009.
 Senior member of SBrT - Brazilian Society of Telecommunications, SBrT - 2001.
 Academic Recognition Scholarship "Zeferino Vaz" - Universidade Estadual de Campinas, Unicamp - 1996.
 Senior Member of IEEE - Institute of Electrical and Electronics Engineers, IEEE - 1990.

Cronologia

See also

 Universidade Federal do ABC
 Ordem Nacional do Mérito Científico

References

Living people
Commanders of the National Order of Scientific Merit (Brazil)
Year of birth missing (living people)